Ilija Babić (born 3 August 2002) is a Serbian footballer who currently plays as a forward for Mladost Novi Sad, on loan from Red Star Belgrade.

Career statistics

Club

Notes

References

2002 births
Living people
Serbian footballers
Serbia youth international footballers
Association football forwards
Serbian First League players
FK Vojvodina players
Red Star Belgrade footballers
RFK Grafičar Beograd players